The Tiznow Stakes is an American Thoroughbred horse race open to California-bred horses age four and older and contested on dirt at a distance of 1 Mile (8 furlongs). It has been run in late May at Santa Anita Park since 2014. Previously, it was held at Hollywood Park Racetrack in Inglewood, California, where it was run on Cushion Track synthetic dirt at  furlongs.

The race is named for Hall of Famer Tiznow, the only horse to win the Breeders' Cup Classic twice.

Records
Speed  record:
 1:27.10 - Stella Mark (2008) at  furlongs
 1:35.06 - Storm Fighter (2014) at current distance of 1 Mile

Most wins by a horse:
 2 - Avanti Bello (2016, 2017)

Most wins by a jockey:
 4 - Rafael Bejarano (2009, 2012, 2013, 2016)

Most wins by a trainer:
 2 - Ted H. West (2008, 2015)

Winners of the Tiznow Stakes

References
 Santa Anita Park website

Listed stakes races in the United States
Open sprint category horse races
Horse races in California
Santa Anita Park
Recurring sporting events established in 2003
2003 establishments in California